Anders von Düben the Younger (28 August 167323 August 1738) was a Swedish composer, kapellmeister and hofmarschall. He was a member of the Düben family, which is noted for its role in the establishment of professional musical culture in Sweden.

Life and work 
Anders von Düben was born into the Düben family, a Swedish noble family known for its baroque music. He was the son of Gustaf Düben and Emerentia Standaert, thus of German and Dutch descent. His siblings included Joachim and Emerentia, who served as Queen Ulrika Eleonora's lady-in-waiting. 

Düben studied in Paris during the 1690s, and acquired the position of court chapel master at the Swedish royal court orchestra in 1698. Düben thereafter took office as chamberlain and hofmarschall. 

Düben composed a few works, including both vocal music and instrumental music. One of his documented compositions was vocal music for the Ballet de Narva mounted in Stockholm in 1701.

Düben was ennobled in 1707, and raised to baronial rang in 1719. Joachim and Emerentia were also elevated to nobility at the same time. By 1726, Düben had given up all his musical works to devote his time in his responsibilities at court.

See also 

 Düben collection

References

External links 

 Mss. of works collected by the family, the "Düben collection"

1673 births
1738 deaths
17th-century classical composers
17th-century Swedish musicians
18th-century Swedish musicians
Swedish Baroque composers
Swedish classical composers
Swedish male classical composers
Swedish people of German descent
Swedish people of Dutch descent
17th-century male musicians
18th-century male musicians
18th-century musicians
Anders

Barons of Sweden
Musicians from Stockholm